The Holy Spirit Church is the name given to a religious building belonging to the Catholic Church and located on 8th Street Malev, Valga in Estonia. The church has been classified as cultural and heritage monument, so it is protected.

It is a neo-Gothic building which was built in granite and brick and decorated with red bricks. Builders were among railroad workers from Lithuania and Poland. The church was completed in 1907. The tower was not completed because the authorities did not give permission to build.

The church operated until 1940. Since 1945, the building was used as a warehouse and later as a gym. In 1995 an extension and remodeling was completed, and was again used as a place of worship.

Because of the diversity of nationalities that make up the congregation offer Masses in Estonian and Russian, on Saturdays and Sundays and Catholic holidays.

See also
Roman Catholicism in Estonia

References

Roman Catholic churches in Estonia
Roman Catholic churches completed in 1907
Valga, Estonia
1907 establishments in the Russian Empire
20th-century Roman Catholic church buildings
Gothic Revival church buildings in Estonia